Contemporary Christian music (CCM), also known as Christian pop, and occasionally inspirational music, is a genre of modern popular music, and an aspect of Christian media, which is lyrically focused on matters related to the Christian faith and stylistically rooted in Christian music. It was formed by those affected by the 1960s Jesus movement revival who began to express themselves in other styles of popular music, beyond the church music of hymns, gospel and Southern gospel music that was prevalent in the church at the time. Initially referred to as Jesus music, today, the term is typically used to refer to pop, but also includes rock, alternative rock, hip hop, metal, contemporary worship, punk, hardcore punk, Latin, electronic dance music, R&B-influenced gospel and country styles.

It has representation on several music charts including Billboards Christian Albums, Christian Songs, Hot Christian AC (Adult Contemporary), Christian CHR, Soft AC/Inspirational and Christian Digital Songs as well as the UK's Official Christian & Gospel Albums Chart. Top-selling CCM artists will also appear on the Billboard 200. In the iTunes Store, the genre is represented as part of the Christian and gospel genre while the Google Play Music system labels it as Christian/Gospel.

History 

The growing popularity of rock and roll music in the 1950s was initially dismissed by the church because it was believed to encourage sinfulness. Yet as evangelical churches adapted to appeal to more people, the musical styles used in worship changed as well by adopting the sounds of this popular style.

The genre became known as contemporary Christian music as a result of the Jesus movement revival in the latter 1960s and early 1970s, and was originally called Jesus music. "About that time, many young people from the sixties' counterculture professed to believe in Jesus. Convinced of the "bareness" of a lifestyle based on drugs, free sex and "radical politics", some of the Jesus 'hippies' became known as 'Jesus people'". However, there were people who felt that Jesus was another "trip". It was during the 1970s Jesus movement that Christian music started to become an industry within itself. "Jesus music" started by playing instruments and singing songs about love and peace, which then translated into love of God. Paul Wohlegemuth, who wrote the book Rethinking Church Music, said "[the] 1970s will see a marked acceptance of rock-influenced music in all levels of church music. The rock style will become more familiar to all people, its rhythmic excesses will become refined, and its earlier secular associations will be less remembered."

Evangelical artists made significant contributions to contemporary Christian music in the 1960s, developing various Christian music styles, from Christian rock to Christian hip-hop passing through the Christian punk or the Christian metal.  Those involved were affected by the late 1960s to early 1970s Jesus movement, and colloquially self-referred to as "Jesus Freaks", as the counterculture movement of hippies, flower children, and flower power swept the nation.  The Calvary Chapel was one such movement, which launched Maranatha Music in 1971.  They soon began to express themselves in alternative styles of popular music and worship music. The Dove Awards, an annual ceremony which rewards Christian music, was created in Memphis, Tennessee in October 1969 by the Gospel Music Association. 

Larry Norman is often remembered as the "father of Christian rock", because of his early contributions (before the Jesus movement) to the developing new genre that mixed rock rhythms with the Christian messages. Though his style was not initially well received by many in the Christian community of the time, he continued throughout his career to create controversial hard-rock songs such as "Why Should the Devil Have All the Good Music?". He is remembered as the artist "who first combined rock 'n' roll with Christian lyrics" in the Gospel Music Hall of Fame. Though there were Christian albums in the 1960s that contained contemporary-sounding songs, there were two albums recorded in 1969 that are considered to be the first complete albums of "Jesus rock": Upon This Rock (1969) by Larry Norman initially released on Capitol Records, and Mylon – We Believe by Mylon LeFevre, released by Cotillion, which was LeFevre's attempt at blending gospel music with southern rock. Unlike traditional or southern gospel music, this new Jesus music was birthed out of rock and folk music.

Pioneers of this movement also included Andraé Crouch and the Disciples, 2nd Chapter of Acts, Barry McGuire, Evie, Paul Clark, the Imperials and Keith Green among others. The small Jesus music culture had expanded into a multimillion-dollar industry by the 1980s. Many CCM artists such as Benny Hester, Amy Grant, DC Talk, Michael W. Smith, Stryper, and Jars of Clay found crossover success with Top 40 mainstream radio play.

The genre emerged and became prevalent in the 1970s and 1980s. Beginning in July 1978, CCM Magazine began covering "contemporary Christian music" artists and a wide range of spiritual themes until it launched online publications in 2009.

It has certain themes and messages behind the songs and their lyrics including praise and worship, faith, encouragement and prayer. These songs also focus on themes of devotion, inspiration, redemption, reconciliation and renewal. Many people listen to contemporary Christian music for comfort through tough times. The lyrics and messages conveyed in CCM songs have had varied, positive Christian messages over the decades. For instance, some of the songs have been aimed to evangelize and some of the lyrics are meant to praise and worship Jesus. One of the earliest goals of CCM was to spread the news of Jesus to non-Christians. In addition, contemporary Christian music also strengthens the faith of Christians.

Various evangelical record labels have supported the movement. In Christian rock, there is Sparrow Records founded in 1976 in the United States by Billy Ray Hearn, a Christian music graduate from the Baylor University.   The songs of Hillsong Music, founded in 1991 by Hillsong Church, in Sydney, Australia, have been translated into various languages and have had an influence considerable in evangelical churches worldwide.

In Christian hip-hop, TobyMac, Todd Collins, and Joey Elwood founded the first specialized label Gotee Records in 1994.  The founding of the label Reach Records in 2004 by Lecrae and Ben Washer also had a significant impact in the development of Christian hip-hop.

Style and artists 
Contemporary Christian music has influences from folk, gospel, pop and rock music. Genres of music such as soft rock, folk rock, alternative, hip-hop, etc. have played a large influence on CCM.

Charismatic churches have had a large influence on contemporary Christian music and are one of the largest producers of CCM. Hillsong Church is one of the many prominent CCM artists. Contemporary Christian music has also expanded into many subgenres. Christian punk, Christian hardcore, Christian metal and Christian hip hop, although not normally considered CCM, can also come under the genre's umbrella. Contemporary worship music is also incorporated in modern CCM. Contemporary worship is both recorded and performed during church services.

In the 2000s, contemporary worship music with a distinctly theological focus has emerged, primarily in the Baptist, Reformed and more traditional non-denominational branches of Protestant Christianity. Artists include well-known groups such as Shane & Shane and Hillsong United and modern hymn-writers, Keith & Kristyn Getty as well as others like Sovereign Grace Music, Matt Boswell and Aaron Keyes. The format is gaining traction in many churches and other areas in culture as well as being heard in CCM collections & musical algorithms on several internet streaming services.

Controversy 
Contemporary Christian music has been a topic of controversy in various ways since its beginnings in the 1960s. The Christian college Bob Jones University discourages its dormitory students from listening to CCM. Others simply find the concept of Christian pop/rock music to be an unusual phenomenon, since rock music has historically been associated with themes such as nonconformity, sexual promiscuity, rebellion, drug and alcohol use and other topics normally considered antithetical to the teachings of Christianity, especially organized Protestant strains of Christianity in the United States, which emphasize group cohesion at the expense of individual assertion. This controversy caused by evangelical pop music was explored by Gerald Clarke in his Time magazine article "New Lyrics for the Devil's Music".

Some writers from the Reformed Presbyterian tradition assert that the inclusion of CCM in a worship service violates the second commandment and the regulative principle of worship because it adds man-made inventions, lyrics and instrumental music to the biblically appointed way of worshipping God.

Contemporary Christian musicians and listeners have sought to extend their music into settings where religious music traditionally might not be heard. For instance, MercyMe's song "I Can Only Imagine" was a crossover success despite having a clear Christian message.

Paul Baker, author of Contemporary Christian Music, addressed the question, "Is the music a ministry, or is it entertainment? The motives, on both sides, were nearly always sincere and well intentioned, rarely malicious."

"The responsibility of the church is not to provide escape from reality", according to Donald Ellsworth, the author of Christian Music in Contemporary Witness, "but to give answers to contemporary problems through legitimate, biblical means."

Many studies on church growth show that churches have grown in size after changing the style of music. James Emery White, a consultant for preaching and worship within the Southern Baptist Convention, made a statement about how many churches that changed styles to using more contemporary Christian music, appeared to have a quicker growth.

Growth 

Contemporary Christian album sales had increased from 31 million in 1996 to 44 million sales in 2000. Since EMI's purchase of Sparrow Records, sales had increased 100 percent.  However, the main goal of the label continues to be aspiring to make a positive impact on the world through contemporary Christian music. The company has given back money to the CCM community. Overall, according to Tyler Huckabee of The Week online magazine on February 17, 2016, CCM sales had plummeted to 17 million in sales (related in part to the decline in the sales, mostly of compact discs, seen also in the overall music industry in the United States during the 2010s and competition with legal, purchased digital downloads of individual songs).

See also

Notes

Further reading 
 Alfonso, Barry. The Billboard Guide . Billboard Books, 2002.
 
 
 
 
 
 
 
 
 
 
 
 
 Romanowski, William D. Eyes Wide Open: Looking for God in Popular Culture. Brazos Press, 2001.
 Sears, Gordon E. Is Today's Christian Music Sacred? Coldwater, Mich.: [s.n., 199-?]. 32, [1] p. Without ISBN
 Stephens, Randall J. (2018). The Devil's Music: How Christians Inspired, Condemned, and Embraced Rock 'n' Roll. Harvard University Press.
 Stowe, David W. (2013). No Sympathy for the Devil: Christian Pop Music and the Transformation of American Evangelicalism. University of North Carolina Press.
 Young, Shawn David (2015). Gray Sabbath: Jesus People USA, the Evangelical Left, and the Evolution of Christian Rock. Columbia University Press.

 
20th-century music genres
21st-century music genres
Christian music genres
Evangelicalism in the United States
Popular music
Radio formats